Martin Vlach (born 2 May 1997) is a Czech modern pentathlete.

He participated at the 2018 World Modern Pentathlon Championships, winning a medal.

References

External links

Living people
1997 births
Czech male modern pentathletes
World Modern Pentathlon Championships medalists
Modern pentathletes at the 2014 Summer Youth Olympics
Modern pentathletes at the 2020 Summer Olympics
Olympic modern pentathletes of the Czech Republic
Sportspeople from Prague